Matrix Realty Group, Inc. is an American real estate company based in Port Jefferson, New York, United States. Glen Nelson was the CEO of the privately held real estate investment-development firm and management company which has holdings throughout the United States. The company owns and manages over 6 million square feet of Class A commercial office buildings, 10,000 multi-family residential units, and other commercial properties.

Ownership and history
The Matrix Realty Group was founded in 1993 by Richard Nieto, and after 4 years, the late Glen Nelson joined as managing partner.  Nieto is responsible for managing all aspects of the Matrix Realty Group. Since 1993, he has overseen the acquisition, financing, leasing, property management, redevelopment, and sale of over 10 million square feet of real estate throughout the United States. Richard Nieto's focus was on the purchase of defaulted notes.

According to the New York Real Estate Journal, the real estate company started with ″absolutely no money and organically grew without the help of investors or partners. ″Matrix has grown due to the sincere and genuine way of doing business the old school way – with a handshake.″  (New York Real Estate Journal October 27, 2015 "Executive of The Month")

One of Matrix's most recent projects includes a $40M housing, office project planned for Grant Deneau Tower in downtown Dayton.

On December 20, 2015, two days before his 49th birthday, Nelson died when he lost control of his car while driving along East Broadway in Port Jefferson, New York.  He was later pronounced dead at a nearby hospital.

Matrix Realty Group’s notable properties 

 Matrix Corporate Park Hauppauge/Islandia Long Island, NY – 400,000 sq/ft
 Matrix Corporate Center at Danbury, CT - 1.2 million square-foot office complex 
 Matrix MHC Homes - Various locations throughout Michigan and Alabama

Food and dining businesses
Restaurant related properties include Gasho of Japan in Hauppauge and Central Valley, New York, and The Matrix Conference and Banquet Center at the Danbury Corporate Center facility in Connecticut.

References

Links
Matrix Corporate Center

https://commons.wikimedia.org/wiki/File:Glen_Nelson_CEO_Matrix_Realty_Group,_Inc.jpg

Port Jefferson, New York
Real estate companies of the United States
Companies established in 1993
Companies based in Suffolk County, New York